AT&T Building, AT&T Field, AT&T Center, AT&T Park, AT&T Tower, or AT&T Stadium may refer to:

Buildings owned or operated by AT&T
The following buildings are directly associated with AT&T or its predecessors or subsidiaries:
AT&T Midtown Center, Atlanta
AT&T City Center, Birmingham, Alabama
AT&T Huron Road Building, Cleveland
Whitacre Tower also known as One AT&T Plaza, Dallas
AT&T Michigan Headquarters, Detroit
AT&T 220 Building, Indianapolis
AT&T Building (Indianapolis)
AT&T Building (Kingman, Arizona)
AT&T Switching Center, Los Angeles
AT&T Tower (Minneapolis)
AT&T Building (Nashville)
AT&T Building (Omaha)
AT&T Center (St. Louis)
AT&T Building (San Diego)

Former
550 Madison Avenue, formerly AT&T Building, New York City
32 Avenue of the Americas, formerly AT&T Long Distance Building or AT&T Building, New York City
33 Thomas Street, formerly AT&T Long Lines Building, New York City
Franklin Center (Chicago), formerly AT&T Corporate Center
South Park Center (Los Angeles), formerly AT&T Center
TIAA Bank Center, formerly AT&T Tower, Jacksonville, Florida

AT&T naming rights
The following are not directly owned or operated by AT&T, but are named for the company as the result of a naming rights purchase. 
AT&T Center, San Antonio, Texas
AT&T Stadium, Arlington, Texas
AT&T Field, Chattanooga, Tennessee
AT&T Performing Arts Center, Dallas
Jones AT&T Stadium, Lubbock, Texas

Former
NRG station, formerly AT&T Station, Philadelphia
Oracle Park, formerly AT&T Park, San Francisco

Buildings and structures disambiguation pages